The 2016–17 season is the 3rd season of the Women's British Basketball League. The league consists of 10 teams from across the United Kingdom.

Teams

The line-up for the 2016-17 season features the following teams:

Format
WBBL Championship Each team plays each other once home and once away for a total of 18 games.

WBBL CupThe two new entrants to the league, Caledonia Pride and Oaklands Wolves were joined in the first round by the two lowest ranked finishers from the 2015-16 season, Manchester Mystics and Cardiff Met Archers. From there, a straight knockout competition was played. The 2016-17 Cup final was won by the Manchester Mystics, who defeated the Nottingham Wildcats 71-60. The final was played at the Barclaycard Arena in Birmingham.

WBBL Trophy The ten teams are split into two geographical groups, North and South. Each team plays each other once home or away for a total of 4 games. The top 2 teams in each group progress to the semi finals, where they play for the two final spots. The 2016-17 Trophy final was won by Sevenoaks Suns, who defeated the Leicester Riders 82-67. The final was played at the Emirates Arena in Glasgow.

Regular Season Standings

Playoffs

Quarter-finals

References

2016–17 in British basketball leagues
basketball
basketball